Pronoia may refer to:

 Pronoia (plural pronoiai, Greek for "provisions"), a system of land grants in the Byzantine Empire
 Pronoia (psychology), the phenomenon akin to the opposite of paranoia
 The Greek term for providence (usually Divine Providence) in ancient Greek philosophy